Nuroa is a vertical real estate search engine that displays real estate offers available on the internet for rental, sale and sharing of property including holiday rentals.

History
Nuora was founded by Oriol Blasco and Gary Stewart in 2006. In August 2007, the project was presented at the Essential Web 2007 conference in London.

Between September 2007 and 2009, Nuroa launched in several new markets including;

 Spain, winning Red Herring Europe Award.
 Germany
 In 2009, Nuroa expanded globally, reaching 15 countries, adding Italy, Portugal, France, Austria, Switzerland, United Kingdom, Ireland, Mexico, Chile, Brasil, Argentina, Australia, and the United States.
 In 2016, Nuroa was acquired by Mitula Group, a classifieds vertical search, when was operating in United Kingdom, Germany, Austria, France, Italy, Ireland, Switzerland, the United States, Argentina, Brazil, Mexico, Chile, Australia, Peru, Colombia, Spain and Portugal.
 In 2019 became part of Lifull Connect after the acquisition of Mitula Group by Lifull
 In 2022 Nuroa operates in 26 countries, adding United Emirates, South Africa, Ecuador, Venezuela, Morocco, Malaysia, Peru, Philippines, Pakistan and India to already existing markets

Data
 30 million ads - October 2014  
 2 million users - September 2014 
 15 countries - October 2014 
 3 main products : Sale-Rent-Share-Holiday rentals

Criticism
Results depend on the accuracy of the original listings, which are often poorly maintained or out of date, yet appear in search results.

See also
Property portal
Zoopla
Rightmove
Nestoria

References

External links
Official Website
Property Portal

Real estate companies established in 2006
Internet properties established in 2006
Online real estate databases
Internet search engines
Property services companies of the United Kingdom